Sedliště is a municipality and village in Frýdek-Místek District in the Moravian-Silesian Region of the Czech Republic. It has about 1,700 inhabitants.

Geography
Sedliště lies in the historical region of Cieszyn Silesia. It is located on the border between the Ostrava Basin and the Moravian-Silesian Foothills.

History

The creation of the village was a part of a larger settlement campaign taking place in the late 13th century on the territory of what will be later known as Upper Silesia. Sedliště was first mentioned in a Latin document of Diocese of Wrocław called Liber fundationis episcopatus Vratislaviensis from around 1305 as Sedlicz.

Politically Sedliště belonged initially to the Duchy of Teschen, ruled by a local branch of Piast dynasty. In 1327 the duchy became a fee of Kingdom of Bohemia, which after 1526 became part of the Habsburg monarchy.

Sedliště became a seat of a Catholic parish, mentioned in the register of Peter's Pence payment from 1447 among 50 parishes of Teschen deaconry as Czedlicz.

In 1573 it was sold as one of 16 villages and the town of Frýdek and formed a state country split from the Duchy of Teschen.

After World War I and fall of Austria-Hungary it became a part of Czechoslovakia. In March 1939 it became a part of Protectorate of Bohemia and Moravia. After World War II it was restored to Czechoslovakia.

Sights
The most valuable building is the wooden Church of All Saints. It was first mentioned in 1447 and replaced by a new building in 1638. In 1862, the belfry was replaced by a new tower.

References

External links

 

Villages in Frýdek-Místek District
Cieszyn Silesia